Zafir Patel (born 14 September 1992, full name Zafir Rashid Patel) is an Indian cricketer who played three First-class match for Leeds/Bradford MCCU and TWO list A games. He was born in Baroda, Gujarat, and is the son of former international cricketer Rashid Patel. He was brought by the Delhi Daredevils for the 2012 Indian Premier League.

References

Delhi Capitals cricketers
1992 births
Living people
Indian cricketers
Leeds/Bradford MCCU cricketers